Muhammed Kazaure Gudaji is a member of the Nigerian House of Representatives representing the Kazaure, Roni, Gwiwa, Yankwashi Constituency of Jigawa State.

He obtained his WASC from the Government Secondary School in Dala, Kano State in 1994. He is among the most vibrant member house representative in Nigeria. He contribute a lot to house such as effect of banditry is more harm than novel Covid19 disapproval of nominating Godwin Emefiele and where he said he should be allowed to channel soldiers to Sambisa.

Hon. Muhammad Kazaure Gudaji urges the Federal Government to prioritize tackling insecurity in Northern Nigeria over COVID-19
On june 18, 2021, Hon. Muhammed Gudaji Kazaure During a plenary session, he made a passionate plea to the Federal Government to intensify its efforts towards addressing the insecurity challenges in the nation, particularly in the northern region. 

According to Hon. Kazaure, armed banditry poses a greater threat to the country than the COVID-19 pandemic, as hundreds of innocent citizens are being killed daily by these criminal elements. He emphasized that the number of deaths resulting from the pandemic is insignificant compared to the number of people being killed by bandits in various parts of the north.

Hon. Kazaure further called on the Federal Government to prioritize the issue of insecurity and take more decisive measures to combat the menace. He suggested that the government should shut down the country to address the security situation, rather than as a result of the pandemic.

In his words, "Mr. Speaker, I don't believe in coronavirus, and it cannot catch me. Tell me how many people coronavirus have killed in Nigeria and how many people are killed in a single day by armed bandits in Katsina, Sokoto, Zamfara, Kaduna, and other parts of the north. So what I'm saying is banditry is more dangerous than the coronavirus pandemic.”

Hon. Kazaure's remarks highlight the urgent need for the Nigerian government to address the escalating security challenges in the country, particularly in the northern region.

Central Bank of Nigeria Denies Allegations of Unaccounted Stamp Duty Collections Made by Hon Muhammad gudaji kazaure

On December 17, 2022, the Central Bank of Nigeria (CBN) denied allegations made by a member of the House of Representatives, Gudaji Kazaure, that N89.09 trillion in stamp duty collections had been diverted and that the CBN Governor, Godwin Emefiele, kept $171 billion in the bank's private investors' account as proceeds of stamp duty. 

The CBN Director of Corporate Communication, Mr. Osita Nwanisobi, stated that the allegations were unfounded and shocking since the assets of the entire banking industry were less than the amount being taunted. He also clarified that the CBN had nothing to do with the stamp duty collections other than keeping the records in line with the provision of law.

Mr. Nwanisobi further explained that if there was a committee in charge of stamp duty collections, it had nothing to do with the CBN. He added that the I & E window, a platform where people trade in foreign exchange, was not an account, and transactions by CBN on the platform did not reach $171 billion as claimed in a publication.

Regarding the allegations that critical institutions, including the CBN, Office of the Secretary to the Government of the Federation, and the Protocol Department of the State House, prevented Mr. Kazaure from briefing President Muhammadu Buhari  on findings made, Mr. Nwanisobi stated that the committee was not approved by the CBN, and the issue of the committee had been addressed by the committee itself.

The presidency also dismissed the allegations of misappropriation of stamp duty funds and described the claim as a figment of the imagination of Mr. Kazaure. A statement by the Senior Special Assistant to the President on Media and Publicity, Garba Shehu, emphasized that it was unconstitutional for a member of the parliament to be the secretary of an executive committee.

Mr. Nwanisobi emphasized that the CBN's responsibility was to keep up with the law and maintain a record of all transactions. He reiterated that the 40:60 (N100) ratio stamp duty was obedience to the law, and issues around stamp duty were obedience to the law, not about the CBN. He concluded that the CBN was an institution with statutory flavor and did not set up a committee despite it being set up by President Muhammadu Buhari.

References

1972 births
Members of the House of Representatives (Nigeria)
Living people
Action Congress of Nigeria politicians
People from Jigawa State
All Progressives Congress politicians
Nigerian customs service officer